Reynante Magat Langit (born September 20, 1948) is a Filipino journalist. He is a longtime columnist for Philippine newspapers Tempo, Balita, People's Tonight, and Pilipino Mirror.  He is also the main anchorman for the nationally-aired program over AM radio station DZRJ 810 kHz  in Mega Manila.  He currently hosts two weekly public affairs television programs , Kasangga Mo Ang Langit and Biyaheng Langit, which airs every Saturday afternoon on RJ DigiTV (even his surname means "sky" or "heaven" in Tagalog).

Early life
A man of truly humble beginnings, Rey expressed his dynamism at a very young age.  He would pull the weeds in a Chinese neighbor's garden for ten centavos a bundle, drove a pedicab, sell comics magazines to his classmates, and would even sell native foods like "kakanin" and "matamis na bao" to them at snack time to support his schooling expenses.  He finished his primary education at the F.G. Caldreon Elementary School, a public school in Manila.  He started his First year of High School in MLQU and finished the rest of his high school education at the Far Eastern University Boys High School.

Already a working student, he pursued his college education at the Far Eastern University. He is a BS Commerce graduate and an exemplary student leader.  He was a Director of the Order of Parliamentarians Confraternity; President of the IABF Banking Association; a Model Cadet and ROTC Officer; undisputed “Duplo King”; President of FEU Philippine Cultural Performance Arts Group; RHO OMEGA TAU Fraternity; and a Director of the FEU Progressive Party.  He finished second year law at the FEU College of Law.

Journalistic career
Rey Langit went on to join the media, becoming a radio announcer, anchorman, and commentator.  His public service programs have helped ease the plights of  many suffering Filipinos, including OCWs (Overseas Contract Workers who are now referred to as OFWs -Overseas Filipino Workers) and their families.  He became the link of the ordinary Filipino to the government and its agencies in solving their problems. Because of his tireless efforts to help those in need through his public service programs and activities, he has received various commendations, honors, awards and recognitions both local and international groups and entities.

Known for his unique and unmistakable booming voice, Pareng Rey or Sky, has been on the air for more than four decades.  Millions of Filipinos start their day listening to Pareng Rey on the radio as he informs them of the current events and pressing issues that affect their lives.  During the People Power Revolution that installed Cory Aquino into power in 1986, Langit was continuously on the air for two days.  Other radio stations had stopped broadcasting midway into the revolt, but Langit refused to be silenced.  His voice became the only resource for millions of Filipinos who wanted to know what was going on in the country's capital.  He reported on troop movements all over the city, and as ordinary citizens began walking out of their homes, and gathering on the streets to keep vigil and form human barricades. Langit first used the term "People Power", which went on to become the popular term used for the first peaceful revolution.  In 1989, with the Aquino Administration far from being stable, Langit once more became the voice that the Filipino masses listened to as he courageously reported on what became a series of coup d'état attempt to overthrow the Aquino administration.  Pareng Rey Langit was awarded the prestigious "Radio Broadcast Journalist of the Year" award given by the Rotary Club of Manila the following year.  In 2004, Langit was once more named "Radio Broadcast Journalist of the Year" by the Rotary Club of Manila for his outstanding achievements in public service through broadcast media and his exceptional and in- depth reports on relevant and important issues.  He was cited for his dedication to helping overseas Filipino workers through his various TV and radio programs.

Aside from being an admired and multi-awarded broadcaster, Langit is also an accomplished leader.  He was the Station Manager of the AM Radio station DWIZ 882 kHz. and vice president of Aliw Broadcasting Corporation until 2016 where he decided to run again as a Senator but lost in the elections. After the elections and the death of Aliw Broadcasting Corporation chairman Antonio Cabangon-Chua, Langit bid goodbye to his station for 24 years, DWIZ and transferred to DZRJ 810 kHz Radyo Bandido (which his radio program continues to air until now) and PTV as anchor of programs "Insider Exclusive Kapihan" "Kasangga Mo ang Langit" (which his TV program also airs over RJ DigiTV), and "Balitang Tanghali".

He is also the chairman of the Kapisanan ng mga Brodkaster ng Pilipinas-Metro Manila Chapter and is a member of the board of directors of the KBP-National.  Langit is also the Chairman of the Heavenly Images Productions for Television, Inc. (HIP TV, Inc.) which is an independent media production house producing its own television and radio programs.

Personal life
Rey Langit is married to Ester Dino Langit and has two sons, Reyster (March 14, 1973 – June 2, 2005)  and Reynante Langit, Jr. (JR, born April 11. 1976).

In 2005, His late son, Reyster Langit, also a journalist, died of heart failure due to cerebral malaria, a disease he contracted in Palawan while on assignment for the public affairs program Kasangga Mo Ang Langit.  His last son, JR, has since joined him in the field of broadcasting.

Politics
Langit ran for a Senate seat in the 1998, 2010, 2016, 2022 elections under Reporma-LM, Lakas Kampi–CMD, the United Nationalist Alliance (UNA), and PDP–Laban respectively but lost all.

Filmography

Movies
Muslim Magnum 357 (2014)
Pepot Artista (2005)
To Saudi With Love (1997)
Tora, Tora, Bang, Bang, Bang, Bang (1990)
May Isang Tsuper ng Taxi (1990) (cameo role as a former DZRH Radio Announcer)
Muslim .357 (1986)
Ang Padrino (1984) (as FPJ's hired assassin)

Radio
 Kasangga Mo ang Langit (DZRJ-AM)

Television
Kasangga Mo Ang Langit (RPN 9; IBC 13; PTV 4; Radio Bandido TV; RJ DigiTV)
PTV Balita (PTV 4)
Biyaheng Langit (RPN 9; IBC 13)
Action 9 (RPN 9)
Newswatch Aksyon Balita (RPN 9)
FPJ's Batang Quiapo (Kapamilya Channel)

References

People's Television Network
RPN News and Public Affairs people
IBC News and Public Affairs people
1948 births
Living people
Kapampangan people
People from Pampanga
Filipino radio journalists
Filipino television journalists
Far Eastern University alumni